The World Deadlift Championships is a (mostly) annual competition featuring strength athletes from all over the world, competing exclusively in the strongman deadlift. It was created by Giants Live and the championship focuses mainly on the maximum deadlift in pursuit of the deadlift world record, although in the 2017 edition, the event was changed to a  weight for the most repetitions in 60 seconds before reverting to a maximum weight format in 2019 after a one-year hiatus.

Champions

 1  While Makarov has declared for Russia, he competed for Georgia at the 2022 World Deadlift Championships. 
 2  While Makarov has declared for Russia, he competed for Ukraine at the 2021 World Deadlift Championships.

Heaviest lifts

In history

 3  This lift was set while Mitchell Hooper was representing Australia. Since 2022, Hooper has chosen to represent Canada. 
 4  While Makarov has declared for Russia, he competed for Ukraine at the 2021 World Deadlift Championships.

At the championships

 5  While Makarov has declared for Russia, he competed for Ukraine at the 2021 World Deadlift Championships.

Continental records
 This list features lifts made with a standard bar.

 6  This lift was set while Mitchell Hooper was representing Australia. Since 2022, Hooper has chosen to represent Canada. 
 7  Mitchell Hooper, who is a Canadian citizen, has the heaviest lift for this region at 475kg, but is not listed as he completed the lift while competing for Australia.

Records on other bars

 8  This lift has been included as a reference - sumo deadlifts are classified as illegal in strongman competitions.

Individual results

2014
The 2014 World Deadlift Championships were held at the Headingley Stadium in Leeds, England on August 9, 2014. Magnússon set a new world record with a lift of 461 kg.

Results

Records

2015
The 2015 World Deadlift Championships were held at the Headingley Stadium in Leeds, England on July 11, 2015. Hall set a new world record with a lift of 463 kg.

Results

Records

2016
The 2016 World Deadlift Championships were held at the 2016 Europe's Strongest Man event at the First Direct Arena in Leeds, England. Hall set a new world record, becoming the first person in history to deadlift 500 kg.

Results

Records

2017
The 2017 World Deadlift Championships were held at the Giants Live Finals event in Manchester, England. In this edition, the championships were changed to a deadlift for the most repetitions in 60 seconds format with a fixed weight of 400 kg.

Results

2019
The 2019 World Deadlift Championships were held at the Wembley Arena in Wembley, England, as the opening event for Giants Live Wembley. In this edition, the championships returned to the max weight deadlift format.

Results

Records

2021
The 2021 World Deadlift Championships were held at the AO Arena in Manchester, England, as the opening event for Giants Live World Open.

Results

Records

 9  While Makarov has declared for Russia, he competed for Ukraine at the 2021 World Deadlift Championships.

2022
The 2022 World Deadlift Championships were held at the Cardiff International Arena in Cardiff, Wales, as the opening event for Giants Live World Open. During this competition, as a result of another nationality change, Ivan Makarov became the first strongman to hold the national deadlift record for three different countries, having set the new Georgian record at 453.5kg. Makarov, at the time of the championships also held the Ukrainian (475kg - set 2021) and the Russian records (470kg - set 2019).

Results

Records

 10  While Makarov has declared for Russia, he competed for Georgia at the 2022 World Deadlift Championships.

See also 
Europe's Strongest Man
Giants Live
The World Log Lift Championships

References

External links 

Official Site of Giants Live

Strongmen competitions